Universitarios is the fifth urban sector in the central area of Culiacán, Sinaloa, Mexico. The zone features city's City University of Autonomous University of Sinaloa, including one of the UAS High Schools campuses, the city's Botanical Garden and the Science Center of Sinaloa.

Places of interest

Churches
 La Sagrada Familia (The Sacred Family)
 Cristo Rey (Christ King)

Parks and green areas

Culiacán Botanical Garden
It is a botanical garden of 10 hectares, located next to City University Culiacan, whose main functions are botanical species conservation, scientific research, environmental education and the promotion of culture and recreation.

Club Campestre Culiacán
Private club located in Chapultepec neighborhood, is a big place for events and celebrations. It has many sport fields (tennis, basketball, football, etc.), pools, an auditorium, some events halls and green areas.

Green areas
 Andrés Vidales street-Ave. J. de la Barrera-Fernando Montes de Oca street-Ave. Juan Escutia
 Parque Gabriel Leyva Ave. Álvaro Obregón
 Diamante Integral Homero street-Galileo street
 Neptuno street-Manuel Gómez street-Alberto Vázquez

External links
 H. Ayuntamiento de Culiacán — Official website
 Culiacán Travel Guide - Official website

References

Culiacán